Islamic Association of Physicians of Iran is an Iranian principlist political party affiliated with the Front of Followers of the Line of the Imam and the Leader.

Members 
 Shahab od-Din Sadr
 Ali Akbar Velayati
 Abbas Sheibani
 Mohammad-Karim Shahrzad
 Marzieh Vahid-Dastjerdi

Party leaders

1993–2003

2003–present

References 

Principlist political groups in Iran
1993 establishments in Iran
Political parties established in 1993
Medical associations based in Iran